Chloe Gong (born 16 December 1998) is a Chinese-born New Zealand author of young adult fiction. Her 2020 debut novel, These Violent Delights, was a New York Times best seller.

Life and career 
Gong was born in Shanghai, China, and moved to New Zealand with her family when she was two years old. She has a younger sister and brother. She was raised on the North Shore in Auckland, New Zealand, and attended Rangitoto College. While growing up in New Zealand, Gong was immersed in Chinese culture at home, speaking Shanghainese, cooking Chinese food, and celebrating Chinese holidays.

Gong began writing books at the age of 13 using the Notes app on her iPad. By December 2020, she had written nine books, about one manuscript per year. In 2021, Gong graduated with a  double major in English and International Relations at the University of Pennsylvania. 

Gong wrote her 2020 debut novel, These Violent Delights, in May 2018 after her freshman year of college. The book features a 1920s Romeo and Juliet-esque storyline set in Shanghai. At the age of 21, Gong became one of the youngest writers to author a young adult hardcover on The New York Times Best Seller list. She won the Best Youth Novel at the 2021 Sir Julius Vogel Awards for These Violent Delights. The sequel, Our Violent Ends, was released in November 2021. In 2021, These Violent Delights was noted to be frequently discussed the BookTok community on TikTok, which was associated with an increase in sales.

Gong is also writing a spinoff duology that follows Rosalind, a character from the initial series. The first book of the spinoff duology, Foul Lady Fortune, was released fall 2022.

In November 2021, Gong announced her first adult fantasy trilogy, inspired by Shakespeare's Antony and Cleopatra and China's Kowloon Walled City. The first book of the trilogy, Immortal Longings, will be released in summer 2023.

Bibliography

These Violent Delights series
 These Violent Delights (2020)
 A RomaJuliette Christmas Special (2020) (short story)
 Our Violent Ends (2021)

Foul Lady Fortune series
 Foul Lady Fortune (2022)
 Foul Heart Huntsman (2023)

Flesh and False Gods series
 Immortal Longings (2023)

References

External links
 

Living people
1998 births
Writers from Shanghai
21st-century New Zealand women writers
Chinese emigrants to New Zealand
People educated at Rangitoto College
People from North Shore, New Zealand
University of Pennsylvania alumni